Genesis Alpha is a young adult and science fiction novel by Icelandic author Rune Michaels, and was first published in 2007.

Reception
Esther Keller in her review for Library Media Connection said "This book is primed with material for reluctant readers, but the clunky shifts of tenses at the start of the book may throw them off. Even so, it’s worth sticking with to discover the twists and turns."  Frances Bradburn reviewing for Booklist called it a "fascinating, troubling thriller."  Anthony C. Doyle reviewing for the School Library Journal did not recommend the novel saying "readers looking for a novel about a sibling's criminality would be better served by Patricia McCormick's My Brother's Keeper, and those looking for stories about tissue donation and sibling illness could try Jodi Picoult's My Sister's Keeper"

Notes

External links
 Rune Michaels's Website

American young adult novels
2007 science fiction novels
2007 American novels
Simon & Schuster books